Wei Guangqing (born 1963 in Huangshi City, Hubei Province) is a contemporary Chinese painter. He is known most of all for his Red Wall and Made in China Series. 	Wei Guangqing was one of the main members of the “85’s New Wave Art Movement”. In the 1990s he became one of the most well-known "political Pop artists". His work adopts a flat and symbolic composition, linking traditional ethics and modern culture. “Red Wall” is a symbolic work of pop art, using the traditional woodcarving-illustration prints and stories, through the process of Pop, to imply the various meanings of contemporary private and secular life. Wei Guangqing includes the contradictions of tradition and modernity by using a language related to cartoons and comic strips. His color palette consists of strong, often complementary colors.  The artist creates a historical-ethical Pop with regional significance and uses the age-old tradition as a metaphor about today’s world.

Selected solo exhibitions

 2008 “Old Scriptures”, ShanghART H-Space, Shanghai, China
 2007 “Zuo Tu You Shi”, He Xiangning Art Museum, Shenzhen, China
 2005 “Made in China – the painting of Wei Guangqing”, Hubei Institute of Fine Arts, Wuhan, China
 2004 “Chinese Classics: three word-rhymes”, ShanghART Gallery, Shanghai, China
 2002 “Twenty-six evil spirit passes – the day of peace”, ShanghART Gallery, Shanghai, China
 2000 “The extended virtuous words – red wall series”, ShanghART Gallery, Shanghai, China
 1998 “A simulation experience on the suicide scheme about ‘1’ performance art”, Wuchang East Gate, 	Wuhan, China

Selected group exhibitions

 2008
 “Hubei!”, Edward Pranger Oriental Art Gallery, Amsterdam, The Netherlands
 2007
 “Aired”, ShanghART Gallery, Shanghai, China
 “85&89-85 ART Mind and Post 89 Art”, Expol-Sources Art Space, Beijing, China
 “85 New Wave - The Birth of Chinese Contemporary Art”, Ullens Center for Contemporary Art, Beijing, China
 “Forms of Concepts: The Reform of Concepts of Chinese Contemporary Art 1987-2007－The New Generation and Bad Art”, 2007 Wuhan 2nd Documentary Exhibition of Fine Arts, Wuhan, China
 “Individual Positions 1”, ShanghART Gallery, Shanghai, China
 “Contemporary Cultural Venation-China Version-2007”, Credit Beijing Contemporary Art Exhibition, Today Art Gallery, Beijing, China
 “Wuhan! Wuhan!” Wuhan Contemporary Art Exhibition 2007, Nanjing, China
 “Resonance 2007” Chinese Contemporary Oil Painting Exhibition, Shenzhen Museum of Contemporary Art, Shijiazhuang, China
 “What's Next?” Chinese Contemporary Art Exhibition, Hong Kong City Hall
 “Chinese Contemporary Soart”, The State Tretyakov Gallery, Moscow
 2006	
 “Limitation and Freedom – Spring Market”, Fine Arts Literature Art Center, Wuhan, China
 “New China”, Pablo’s Birthday Gallery, New York, U.S.A
 “Mahjong: Contemporary Chinese Art from the Sigg Collection” (travelling exhibition) Hamburger Kunsthalle, Hamburg, Germany
 Kunstmuseum Bern, Bern, Switzerland
 The 1st Annual Exhibition of Contemporary Chinese Art, Century Forum Art Museum, Beijing, China
 2005	
 “Conspire”, Beijing TS1 Contemporary Art Center 1st Exhibition, Beijing, China
 “China - Contemporary Painting”, Fondazione Carisbo, Bologna, Italy
 2004	
 “The 1st Wu Han Nominative Exhibition of Fine Arts Literature”, Art Gallery of Hubei Institute of Fine Arts, China
 “Beyond Boundaries”, Shanghai Gallery of Art, Shanghai, China
 2003	
 The 3rd Chinese Oil Painting Exhibition, China National Museum of Fine Arts, Beijing, China
 2002	
 “Reinterpretation: A Decade of Experimental Chinese Art”, The First Guangzhou Trienniale, Guangdong Museum of Art, Guangzhou, China
 “Chinart - Chinese Contemporary Art”, Museum Küppersmühle Sammlung Grothe, Germany
 The 17th Asian International Art Exhibition, Daejeon Museum of Art, Daejeon, Korea
 “A Point in Time”, Meilun Art Museum, Changsha, China
 “Conceptual Images - 2002 Chinese Contemporary Oil Painting Exhibition”, Shenzhen Art Museum, Guangdong, China
 “Paris-Pekin”, Espace Pierre Cardin, Paris, France
 2001	
 The 16th Asian International Art Exhibition, Guangdong Museum of Art, China
 “Hotpot”, Hustnernes Hus, Oslo, Norway
 “As long as they catch mice...”, Munkeruphus Gallery, Mumkerphus, Denmark
 2000	
 “Global Conceptualism - Points of Origin, 1950s-1980s”, MIT List Visual Arts Center, Cambridge, USA
 “Global Conceptualism”, Miami Art Museum, U.S.A
 “Chinese Contemporary Painting Exhibition”, Breda's Museum, Breda, The Netherlands
 “Society - The 2nd Academic Exhibition”, Chendu Upriver Gallery, Sichuan, China
 1999	
 “Fortune Global Forum Contemporary Art Exhibit”, Jinmao Podium Bldg. Shanghai
 “Global Conceptualism: Points of Origin, 1950s-1980s”, Queens Museum of Art, New York, USA
 The 14th International Asian Art Exhibition, Asian Art Museum, Fukuoka, Japan
 1998	
 “Chinese Contemporary Art Exhibition”, Haus der Kulturen der Welt, Berlin, Germany
 “China!” (travelling exhibition)
 Haus der Kulturen der Welt, Berlin, Germany
 Artist's House, Vienna, Austria
 Charlottenburg Exhibition Centre, Copenhagen, Denmark
 Zacheta Modern Art Mudrum, Warsaw, Poland
 1997	
 “Talk to China”, Copenhagen, Denmark
 Red & Grey - 8 Chinese Artists”, Soobin, Singapore
 “Quotation Marks - Chinese Contemporary Paintings”, National Art Museum, Singapore
 1996	
 “Reality: Present& Future - '96 Chinese Contemporary Art”, International Art Palace, Beijing, 		China
 1995	
 “New Asian Art Show: China, Korea, Japan” (travelling exhibition),
 Tokyo & Fukuoka, Japan
 Gallery of Capital Normal University, Beijing
 Beyond Ideology: New Art from China”, Haus der Kulturen der Welt, Hamburg, Germany
 1994	
 The 2nd Chinese Oil Painting Exhibition, Shanghai Art Museum; National Art Museum of China, Beijing
 1993	
 ‘93 Chinese Oil Painting Biennale Exhibition, Beijing
 “China's New Art, Post-1989”, Hong Kong Arts Centre and City Hall, Hong Kong
 1992	
 The First Guangzhou Art Biennial in China, Guangzhou International Conference And Exhibition Centre
 The First Bienniale Art Exhibition, Guangzhou
 1991	
 The First Chinese Oil Painting Exhibition, Beijing
 1990	
 “I Don't Want to Play Cards with Cezanne”, Pacific Asia Museum, Pasadena, California, USA
 1989	
 “China/Avant-garde Art Exhibition”, National Art Museum of China, Beijing

References
Wei Guangqing, Made in China. International Publishing House for China's Culture: 2007. 

Wuhan. 2008 Contemporary Art Invitational Exhibition. Wuhan: 2008.

Mahjong. Ostfildern: 2005.

External links
Wei Guangqing at Pranger Oriental Art Gallery 
Wei Guangqing at ArtZineChina 

Painters from Hubei
Living people
1963 births
People from Huangshi